The LG Cup Four Nations is an exhibition association football tournament that took place in Iran.

Participants
The participants were:

 Cameroon B

Venues

Results

Semifinals

Third place match

Final

Scorers
 4 goal
  Carlos Bueno
 3 goal
  Martín Ligüera
 1 goal
  B Ndembe
  Farhad Majidi
  Ali Daei
  Javad Kazemian
  Ali Wahaib
  Hesham Mohammed
  Jassim Swadi
  Horacio Peralta
  Fabián Estoyanoff

See also
LG Cup

References

International association football competitions hosted by Iran
2003–04 in Iranian football
2011 in Cameroonian football